The Parapsychological Association (PA) was formed in 1957 as a professional society for parapsychologists following an initiative by Joseph B. Rhine. Its purpose has been "to advance parapsychology as a science, to disseminate knowledge of the field, and to integrate the findings with those of other branches of science." The work of the association is reported in the Journal of Parapsychology and the Journal of the American Society for Psychical Research.

The Parapsychological Association became affiliated with the American Association for the Advancement of Science in 1969, and it is still an affiliate as of 2019.

History
The Association was created in Durham, North Carolina, on June 19, 1957. Its formation was proposed by Rhine, then Director of the Duke Parapsychology Laboratory at Duke University, at a Workshop in Parapsychology held there. Using the occasion afforded by this wide representation of the field, Rhine proposed that the group form itself into the nucleus of an international professional society in parapsychology.

Its first president was R. A. McConnell, then of the Biophysics Department, University of Pittsburgh, and the first vice-president was Gertrude R. Schmeidler of the Department of Psychology, City College of New York. Rhea White was named Secretary Treasurer. Four others were elected to the council, bringing the total to seven: Margaret Anderson, Remi J. Cadoret, Karlis Osis, and W. G. Roll. One of the co-founding supporters of PA was anthropologist Margaret Mead.

In 1984, Richard Feynman spoke at the annual convention of the association.

Activities
In 1969 the association became formally affiliated with the American Association for the Advancement of Science (AAAS). The work of the association is reported in the Journal of Parapsychology and the Journal of the American Society for Psychical Research.

The current president of the PA is American clinical psychologist James C. Carpenter.

Criticism
The association has its critics, including physicist John Archibald Wheeler, who tried but failed to convince the AAAS to expel the organization in 1979. During his presentation Wheeler incorrectly stated that J. B. Rhine had committed fraud as a student. Wheeler retracted that statement in a letter to the journal Science.

See also
American Society for Psychical Research
International Association for Near-Death Studies
Society for Psychical Research
List of parapsychology topics

References

External links

Parapsychology
1957 establishments in the United States
Organizations established in 1957

cs:Paranormální jev
es:Paranormal
id:Paranormal
it:Paranormale
he:על טבעי
pl:Zjawiska paranormalne
pt:Paranormal
ro:Paranormal
ru:Аномальные явления
tr:Paranormal